Lincoln Fields is a station on Ottawa's transitway located at Carling Avenue and the Sir John A. Macdonald Parkway. It is adjacent to the now-shuttered Lincoln Fields Shopping Centre. It is the main western hub of the transitway system and has a ticket sales and information office as well as a small convenience store. The transitway routes branch off in two directions: westward to Kanata and Stittsville, and southward to Barrhaven. The western branch of the transitway from this point is currently incomplete, forcing westbound routes to use existing streets such as Carling Avenue and the Queensway.

The station has two distinct platform areas. One platform area serves main transitway routes 74 and 75 to Baseline station and Barrhaven, as well as routes 61, 62 and 63 to Bayshore station, and Kanata, along with numerous Connexion and peak period routes to the western and southwestern suburbs. A second platform serves routes that either branch off to Carling Avenue, such as routes 51, 57 and 85, or travel south on the Transitway (routes 58, 82 and 84). Elevated walkways connected the two platforms, however, the elevated walkway is now disconnected from Carling Avenue and served by a temporary pathway from the south side of Carling adjacent the east side of the transitway.

Shopper's bus route 301 (serving Richmond on Mondays), route 303 (serving Carp and Dunrobin on Wednesdays), and route 305 (serving Manotick, Kars, and North Gower on Fridays) travel via Carling Avenue to/from Carlingwood Mall (the terminus for routes 301, 303, and 305).

Connexion routes from Barrhaven, Bells Corners, Stittsville, and Kanata only allow passengers to get off at this station in the morning upon request, but skip it altogether in the afternoon with the exception of route 282 which provides service during the AM peak as well as during the PM peak. This includes route 283 that allows passengers to get off at this station upon request during the AM peak, but returns into full service during the PM peak towards Stittsville/Ottawa–Richmond.

On December 6, 2020, the local bus platform at Lincoln Fields Station moved to the north of its original location due to construction work for the future Stage 2 O-Train station.

Service

The following routes serve Lincoln Fields station as of December 20, 2020:

References

External links
 OC Transpo station page
 OC Transpo Area Map

1982 establishments in Ontario
Railway stations scheduled to open in 2026
Transitway (Ottawa) stations